Hiroyoshi Sasakawa (born 29 August 1966) is a Japanese politician and businessman. He is the member of the House of Representatives for Gunma 3rd district belonging to the Liberal Democratic Party.

References 

1966 births
Living people
21st-century Japanese politicians

Government ministers of Japan
Liberal Democratic Party (Japan) politicians
Members of the House of Representatives from Gunma Prefecture